Heidegger: A (Very) Critical Introduction is a 2008 book by Sean J. McGrath, in which the author provides a theological analysis of Martin Heidegger's thought and its relation with his political endeavors.

Synopsis
This book can be said to be an extension of McGrath's previous work The Early Heidegger and Medieval Philosophy. McGrath argues for a clear connection between Heidegger’s Nazi sympathies and his relationship to Christianity.

Reception
Heidegger: A (Very) Critical Introduction was commissioned by the Centre for Theology and Philosophy at the University of Nottingham, the theological think-tank headed by the Anglican theologian John Milbank.
It has been reviewed in Notre Dame Philosophical Reviews, Dialog: A Journal of Theology, Religious Studies Review, The Heythrop Journal and Expository Times.
John Hughes described the book as "one of the clearest and most elegantly written [accounts of Heidegger] I have come across."

References 

2008 non-fiction books
Books about Nazism
Books by Sean McGrath
English-language books
Philosophy of religion literature
Works about Martin Heidegger